Kaza is a village in Krishna district of the Indian state of Andhra Pradesh. It is located in Movva mandal of Machilipatnam revenue division. It is one of the villages in the mandal to be a part of Andhra Pradesh Capital Region. The village is also known for hand weaving of garments by using the popular Loom machine. The weavers work as a family to create a beautiful blend of designs to produce a high quality hand woven garments. Cotton, silk and khadhi are the major weaves. The village also holds agriculture as a major livelihood. Famous Novelist Yaddanapudi Sulochana Rani was born here.

History 

Kaza was once the mother land of 20+ Indian Muslim freedom fighters families, among them The Sepoy Mohammad Hanif's family was popular. They rendered the services for the nation in British Indian Army, Independent Indian Army and Indian Reserve Police after retirements.

Some personals also worked in Netaji Subhash Chandra Bose commanded British Indian army company unit. After revolt of Netaji British Government they were sent back home from military services and given pensions.

For all of them British Government awarded Medals and honored for their distinguish services. They participated in both world wars beside of British Indian Army and partnered in Victory.

See also 
Villages in Movva mandal

References 

Villages in Krishna district